Arshad Hossain is a Bangladeshi professional field hockey player and is an international player in Bangladesh. He is a player of Bangladesh national field hockey team.

References 

Bangladeshi male field hockey players
Field hockey players at the 2018 Asian Games
Year of birth missing (living people)
Living people